Filippo Cesarini (1610 – 6 July 1683) was a Roman Catholic prelate who served as Bishop of Nola (1674–1683) and Bishop of Montepeloso (1655–1674).

Biography
Filippo Cesarini was born in 1610.
On 5 July 1655, he was appointed during the papacy of Pope Alexander VII as Bishop of Montepeloso.
On 11 July 1655, he was consecrated bishop by Francesco Maria Brancaccio, Bishop of Viterbo e Tuscania. 
On 12 March 1674, he was transferred by Pope Clement X to the diocese of Nola.
He served as Bishop of Nola until his death on 6 July 1683.

References

External links and additional sources
 (Chronology of Bishops) 
 (Chronology of Bishops) 
 (for Chronology of Bishops) 
 (for Chronology of Bishops) 

17th-century Italian Roman Catholic bishops
Bishops appointed by Pope Alexander VII
Bishops appointed by Pope Clement X
1610 births
1683 deaths